Lieutenant-General Sir Alan Cameron of Erracht (1753 – 9 March 1828) was a Scottish soldier who, at his own expense in 1793, raised the 79th Regiment of Foot (Cameron Highlanders).

Military career
Born in Erracht, near Banavie in Lochaber, Cameron was the eldest son of Donald Cameron of Erracht and Marjorie, daughter of MacLean of Drimmin, who was killed at the Battle of Culloden. It was not until he was 4 years old that he first met his father. He joined the army as a volunteer and served in North America. At the beginning of the American Revolutionary War Cameron was captured by American colonists in 1775 and imprisoned for two years in Philadelphia in Pennsylvania. He returned to Scotland in 1784.

After war was declared with revolutionary France in 1793 Cameron raised the 79th Regiment of Foot and was accepted as its colonel (although his army rank still appears to be no more than major at this point). He commanded the regiment when it joined the forces of the Duke of York in the Flanders Campaign 1794, and during the retreat through Holland 1795. From 1795 to 1797 the regiment was in the West Indies and served at Martinique. Cameron was promoted lieutenant-colonel in 1796. Devastated by fever, the 79th was eventually withdrawn from the West Indies and rebuilt in Guernsey 1798. Cameron again served under York in the Anglo-Russian invasion of Holland in 1799. The 79th was in garrison in Houat in 1800, then joined Abercromby's expedition to Egypt and Minorca in 1801. A second battalion was raised in 1804. Cameron was confirmed as colonel of 79th Foot on 1 January 1805. In 1807 he led his regiment in the expedition against Copenhagen under Cathcart.

Cameron joined the army in the Peninsular in late 1808, as a brigadier-general commanding the 2nd Brigade of Rowland Hill's 3rd Division in Portugal, collecting stragglers from Moore's army. Under Wellesley from 1809, his brigade saw action at Oporto 12 May, then became the 2nd Brigade of Sherbrooke's 1st Division, fighting at Talavera 28 July, and at Busaco 27 September 1810. He was promoted major general on 25 July 1810 and invalided home.

Cameron was noted for his outspoken eccentricity. When asked his opinion on the idea of replacing kilts with ‘trews’ in the Highland regiments he responded famously and at length against it. When the 95th Rifles were added to make up his brigade in late 1808 "On hearing that our four companies were to be put under his command, this gallant but eccentric old chieftain declared, 'he did not want a parcel of riflemen, as he already had a thousand Highlanders, who would face the devil.' Had our corps been raised northward of the Tweed, it is more probable that our brigadier would have set a higher value on us; but we were moved to another brigade before he had an opportunity of judging of the merits or demerits of the Southerners in the field".

Cameron became a Knight of the Bath in 1815 and lieutenant-general in 1819.

References

Queen's Own Cameron Highlanders officers
British Army lieutenant generals
1753 births
1828 deaths
British Army personnel of the American Revolutionary War
American Revolutionary War prisoners of war held by the United States
British Army personnel of the French Revolutionary Wars
British Army personnel of the Napoleonic Wars
British prisoners of war in the American Revolutionary War
Knights Commander of the Order of the Bath